The S. W. R. D. Bandaranaike cabinet was the central government of Ceylon led by Prime Minister S. W. R. D. Bandaranaike between 1956 and 1959. It was formed in April 1956 after the parliamentary election and it ended in September 1959 with Bandaranaike's assassination.

Cabinet members

Parliamentary secretaries

Notes

References

1956 establishments in Ceylon
1959 disestablishments in Ceylon
Cabinets disestablished in 1959
Cabinets established in 1956
Cabinet of Sri Lanka
Ministries of Elizabeth II